David Barford  is a British medical researcher and structural biologist at the MRC Laboratory of Molecular Biology Cambridge, UK.

Education

Barford studied Biochemistry at the University of Bristol and then went on to earn a Doctor of Philosophy from the University of Oxford, supervised by Professor Dame Louise Johnson.

Career and research
Barford worked at the University of Dundee Medical Research Council (MRC) Protein Phosphorylation Unit with Professor Sir Philip Cohen FRS and Tricia Cohen. He was a Cold Spring Harbor Laboratory Fellow at Cold Spring Harbor Laboratory, USA (1991 to 1994). From 1994 he was University Lecturer at the University of Oxford and Fellow of Somerville College, Oxford. In 1999 he was appointed as Professor of Molecular Biology at the Institute of Cancer Research in London. In 2013 Barford was appointed as a group leader at the MRC Laboratory of Molecular Biology, Cambridge. He has been Co-Head of the Division of Structural Studies since Dec 2015.

He was a member of the Faculty of 1000 from 2002 to 2004.

Awards
2017 Honorary DSc University of Bristol
2006 Fellow of the Royal Society
2006 Fellow of the Academy of Medical Sciences
2003 Member, European Molecular Biology Organisation (EMBO)
1998 Colworth Medal of the Biochemical Society

References

British medical researchers
Fellows of the Royal Society
Fellows of the Academy of Medical Sciences (United Kingdom)
Alumni of the University of Bristol
Alumni of the University of Oxford
Members of the European Molecular Biology Organization
Living people
Fellows of Somerville College, Oxford
Year of birth missing (living people)